Madeleine van Oppen is a Dutch ecological geneticist researching at the University of Melbourne. She has been an Australian Research Council Laureate Fellow since 2018.

She obtained her MsC in 1990 and completed her PhD cum laude on the molecular biogeography of seaweeds at the University of Groningen in 1995.

Van Oppen began to study corals in 1997 and coral-associated microorganisms in 2000. She is an expert in reef genetics and in questions regarding coral bleaching and reef restorations. 

In 2005, she was awarded the Dorothy Hill Medal.

Since 2015, she has been a professor at the School of BioSciences at the University of Melbourne, and she leads the Australian Institute of Marine Science.

References 

Living people
Year of birth missing (living people)
Dutch geneticists
University of Groningen alumni
Academic staff of the University of Melbourne